Folkeviljen ("People's Will") is a former Norwegian newspaper, Labour Party organization and was established by parish priest and later Member of Parliament Kristian Tønder in Sjøvegan 1911, and published in Harstad from 1917. Among its later editors were Harald Langhelle, Alfred Skar, Sigurd Simensen, Alfons Johansen and Erling Hall-Hofsø. The newspaper ceased publication in 1956.

References

1911 establishments in Norway
1956 disestablishments in Norway
Defunct newspapers published in Norway
Labour Party (Norway) newspapers
Mass media in Harstad
Norwegian-language newspapers
Newspapers established in 1911
Publications disestablished in 1956
Mass media in Troms